The 1964 United States Senate election in Utah was held on November 3, 1964. 

Incumbent Democratic Senator Frank Moss was re-elected to a second term in office, defeating Republican Ernest L. Wilkinson, the president of Brigham Young University.

Republican primary

Candidates
Sherman P. Lloyd, U.S. Representative from Salt Lake City
Ernest L. Wilkinson, President of Brigham Young University since 1951

Results

General election

Candidates
Ernest L. Wilkinson, President of BYU (Republican)
Frank Moss, incumbent Senator since 1959 (Democratic)

Results

See also 
 1964 United States Senate elections

References 

1964
Utah
United States Senate